Neotoma insularis, the Angel de la Guarda woodrat, is a species of rodent in the family Cricetidae. It is found in the Mexican state of Baja California on Angel de la Guarda Island.

Description 

This species is described as being of medium body size with a relatively short tail.

Classification 

This species, initially described as such by Townsend in 1912, was listed as a subspecies of Neotoma lepida by Burt in 1932. Patton et al. (2008) revised the systematic position of Neotoma lepida and found it to be a species complex, with N. l. insularis being readily distinct from N. lepida, by means of mtDNA phylogeny and various morphological attributes, therefore reverting this population to its initial status as a species, as described by Townsend.

References

Neotoma
Rats
Mammals of Mexico
Mammals described in 1912
Taxa named by Charles Haskins Townsend